Bodo nationalism is an ideology that supports self-determination by the Bodo people. The Bodo people have been increasingly the victims of alleged aggression at the hands of Muslim groups in the Indian state of Assam. Many Bodo nationalists support the establishment of Bodoland as a separate state of India and a homeland for the Bodo people.

See also
Naga nationalism
Assamese nationalism
Tripura nationalism
Tamil nationalism
Tripura Rebellion
Assam conflict

References